Dim Dam Dom is a French television show that aired  for female audiences on ORTF from March 21, 1965 to March 3, 1971. The show was created by Elle chief editor Daisy de Galard.

Premise

Each episode of Dim Dam Dom was hosted every Sunday by a different television host each week , usually a popular actress or singer. Where they would discuss the latest fashion and music trends. The television show was considered revolutionary and trendy for its time.

The only other show aimed exclusively for a female television audience in the 1960s was Magazine féminin which was mainly aimed at housewives as opposed to young French women which was Dim Dam Dom. The show was praised for its sophistication and production values.

References

1965 French television series debuts
1971 French television series endings
1960s French television series
1970s French television series
1960s variety television series
Women in television
French-language television shows